The Mitsubishi Xpander is a compact multi-purpose vehicle (MPV) manufactured by Mitsubishi Motors since 2017. Prominently marketed as a "crossover MPV", the vehicle was introduced in July 2017 in Indonesia, where the vehicle is manufactured and sold as a high-volume model. Introductions in other markets started since 2018, and the vehicle is mainly sold in emerging countries in Southeast Asia along with several Latin American, African and Middle Eastern markets. It was the fourth best-selling Mitsubishi Motors model globally in 2018 and 2019, and became its third best-selling model in 2021.

In late 2019, a more rugged-looking variant was introduced as the Xpander Cross. A rebadged and redesigned variant of the Xpander, with mainly different front and rear fascias, is sold by Nissan as the second-generation Livina since February 2019.

Overview 
The vehicle design was previewed by the XM Concept that was first displayed at the 24th Gaikindo Indonesia International Auto Show in August 2016. The official teaser images of the car were revealed on the Mitsubishi Motors website on 17 July 2017. The car was unveiled in Jakarta on 24 July 2017 and debuted on 10 August 2017 at the 25th Gaikindo Indonesia International Auto Show. The car went on sale in Indonesia on 3 October 2017.

Classified as a "Small Crossover MPV" by the carmaker, the design of the Xpander is claimed to be inspired by crossover SUVs and adopted the then-recent Dynamic Shield design philosophy.

The vehicle has been exported throughout Southeast Asia, Nepal, Bolivia, Peru, Bangladesh, Egypt, the Middle East, Sri Lanka, South Africa, and Mexico. A sub-model called the Xpander Cross has been available as a more rugged-looking variant of the vehicle since November 2019.

The Xpander is manufactured in Indonesia at the Mitsubishi Motors Krama Yudha Indonesia (MMKI) plant, and also assembled by kits by Mitsubishi Motors Vietnam since July 2020, and by DRB-HICOM in Malaysia since September 2020. To meet the unexpected high demand, the MMKI plant increased the production output from 5,000 to 10,000 units per month by early 2018. 104,000 units were sold globally in 2018, followed by 114,000 units sold in 2019, higher than initial annual target of 80,000 units.

Engines

Markets

Asia

Indonesia 
In Indonesia, the Xpander was initially available in five trim levels: GLX, GLS, Exceed, Sport and Ultimate. The manual transmission was initially offered in GLX, GLS and Exceed trims, while the automatic unit was initially offered in Exceed, Sport and Ultimate trims. The GLS trim with automatic transmission and Sport trim with manual unit were added later in August 2018. The Limited Edition variant based on the Ultimate trim with aerokits was made available in April 2019 to commemorate the sale of the Xpander which had reached 100,000 units. Only 1,000 units were made.

The Xpander received a minor update on 21 February 2020 with a redesigned grille and LED headlights. The Exceed, Sport and Ultimate trims received redesigned 16-inch two-tone alloy wheels and some equipments were changed, while the GLX trim was discontinued.

On 20 October 2020, the Black Edition variant based on the Exceed trim was made available limited to 1,000 units.

The Rockford Fosgate Black Edition variant based on the Sport trim was made available on 10 June 2021, which added the Rockford Fosgate subwoofer.

The Xpander received its facelift on 8 November 2021 with redesigned front and rear fascias, headlights, tail lights, dashboard, and steering wheel design. The latter two were only applied to Sport and Ultimate trims. The 4-speed automatic transmission is replaced by a CVT unit and the electronic parking brake is also adopted on Sport (CVT only) and Ultimate trims. Some other updates include increased wheel size (up to 17 inches), digital air conditioning system on Sport and Ultimate trims, adoption of idling start-stop system, the installation of an external exhaust gas recirculation system for the 4A91 engine, improved chassis rigidity, and retuned suspension systems.

Philippines 
The Xpander made its debut in the Philippines on 1 March 2018 and went on sale in May 2018 as the replacement to the Adventure. An imported model, it was initially available in four trim levels: GLX, GLX Plus, GLS and GLS Sport.

The updated Xpander was launched in March 2020 alongside the Xpander Cross, which replaced the GLS Sport trim, making the regular Xpander available in three trim levels.

The Xpander Black Series was unveiled on 4 November 2021, replacing chrome trim in favour of matte black trim on the front and rear fascias, body panels, and door panels.

The facelifted Xpander was unveiled on 5 March 2022 and officially launched on 19 May 2022. For the Philippine market, the facelifted Xpander retained the 4-speed automatic transmission. The GLX Plus variant was removed from the lineup and was replaced by the automatic variant of the GLX.

Thailand 
In Thailand, the Xpander was introduced in August 2018 and is available in two trim levels: GLS Limited and GT.

The facelifted Xpander was released on 22 March 2022. For the Thai market, the facelifted Xpander replaced the 4-speed automatic transmission with the CVT.

Vietnam 
The Xpander was launched in Vietnam on 8 August 2018, initially available in two trim levels: Standard (paired with a 5-speed manual transmission) and Eco (paired with a 4-speed automatic transmission). It became the country's best-selling MPV in the same year, surpassing the Toyota Innova.

The updated Xpander was launched in Vietnam on 3 June 2020, it retains the pre-update lineup alongside the Xpander Cross. Due to the high demand of Xpander in the country, Mitsubishi Motors Vietnam started production of the Xpander locally in its assembly plant in Bình Dương province on 20 July 2020.

The facelifted Xpander was launched on 13 June 2022, which added the flagship Premium trim. It retained the 4-speed automatic transmission from the previous models.

Brunei 
In Brunei, the Xpander was launched in Brunei on 17 May 2019. The trim levels offered are GLX and GLS with 5-speed manual or 4-speed automatic transmissions. The first facelift Xpander for the Bruneian market was launched in November 2020 and leaving only the GLX (automatic model) as a single variant option.

The second facelift Xpander was went on sale in November 2022.

Myanmar 
In Myanmar, the Xpander is available in one trim level: GLS. It has been sold since September 2019.

Bangladesh 
In Bangladesh, the Xpander is only available in one trim level: GLS.

Malaysia 
The Xpander was launched in Malaysia on 20 November 2020. It is locally assembled at the DRB-HICOM facility in Pekan, Pahang and is only offered in one trim.

Latin America

Mexico 
The Xpander was introduced in the Mexican market on 19 July 2021. It is offered in one trim level alongside the Xpander Cross.

Africa

South Africa 
The Xpander was launched in South Africa on 17 June 2021. It is only offered in one trim with 5-speed manual and 4-speed automatic transmission options.

Gallery 
Pre-facelift

Facelift

Xpander Cross 
The Xpander Cross is a more rugged-looking variant of the standard Xpander. It was first introduced in Indonesia on 12 November 2019. It is available with either manual or automatic transmission. The Premium Package is equipped with leather seats, hood emblem and V-Kool window film is also offered as an option for the Xpander Cross with automatic transmission.

On 20 October 2020, the Xpander Cross Rockford Fosgate Black Edition variant based on the Premium Package trim was launched. It was equipped with an improved audio system from Rockford Fosgate that also comes with a subwoofer and power amplifier from Rockford Fosgate. In addition, the variant also comes with black interior and exterior details such as on the roof rails, rims, front and back bumper underguards, and side mirrors. Only 500 units of the variant were produced. On 10 June 2021, the Rockford Fosgate Black Edition variant was reintroduced with an additional 360-degree camera feature.

The Xpander Cross received a black-coloured grille, updated dashboard design, digital air conditioning system, electronic parking brake, and CVT on 8 November 2021.

On 11 August 2022, the Xpander Cross received its facelift at the 29th Gaikindo Indonesia International Auto Show, which consisted of redesigned front and rear fascias, headlights, and tail lights, similar to the regular Xpander. Interior changes included updated steering wheel and an 8-inch digital instrument cluster. Active Yaw Control is standard.

In the Philippines, the Xpander Cross was launched on 12 March 2020 as the replacement of Xpander GLS Sport. It was also launched in Thailand on 16 March 2020. The Xpander Cross was launched in Vietnam on 16 July 2020 alongside the updated Xpander, the model also launched in Brunei on 9 July 2021 and in Mexico on 19 July 2021.

Pre-facelift

Facelift

Reception 
The car was well received at the 2017 Gaikindo Indonesia International Auto Show, as Mitsubishi Motors received 11,827 bookings for the Xpander during the event.

The Xpander has received mixed reviews from critics and journalists from its overseas export markets. Anton Andres of the Manila-based AutoIndustriya.com rated the car 8 out of 10, noting that the car is "comfortable, fuel-efficient, easy to drive (and park), and hugely practical" and "is relatively well equipped and the entire car is well thought out and put together". However, Andres gave a note about its steep price and the following price bumps, but he claimed that it is the best small MPV available if price is taken out of the equation. Richard Leu of Bangkok Post gave a score of 6 out of 10, claimed that "the engine is unremarkable as it lacks power and mated to an antiquated 4-speed automatic", and commented that the Xpander is "solely about usability and not driving ability". Bangkok Post also noted that the Xpander is unable to undercut the 150 g/km level of  emissions and to meet E85-compatibility, making it liable to an excise tax of 30% in Thailand.

Some Indonesian automotive industry experts commented that the Xpander had "created a new trend" in the Indonesian small MPV class, which is the largest car segment in that market, particularly with its crossover SUV-inspired design and thus popularity. They commented, "Mitsubishi took the risk, but it worked successfully nonetheless".

Motorsport

Xpander AP4 

The Xpander AP4 was a rally car that competed in the Asia-Pacific Rally Championship in the AP4 class. It was first shown as the prototype at the 27th Indonesia International Motor Show through April to May 2019. The exterior has been modified to meet FIA AP4 rally standards. The interior has been stripped down and the roll cage has been added. The air conditioning and other unnecessary features have also been removed. The race-ready version of the car was shown at the 27th Gaikindo Indonesia International Auto Show in July 2019. The car would originally make its official rally debut at the NZRC Goldrush Rally of Coromandel in Moewai Park, Whitianga, New Zealand from 16 to 17 August 2019 and piloted by Rifat Sungkar of Xpander Rally Team with Muhammad Redwan as the co-driver, but the FIA homologation process had not been finished at the time. The team then would use a Lancer Evolution VI spare car to be still able to compete in the rally.

Safety 
The Xpander is only available with two airbags, with no option to add the airbag count. Mitsubishi Motors Malaysia senior VP Hoffen Teh stated in 2020 that ASEAN had no real market demand for more than two airbags and hence the Xpander is specifically designed with capability for only two airbags.

Annual production 

(Sources: Facts & Figures 2018, Facts & Figures 2019, Mitsubishi Motors website)

Sales 
As of September 2018, more than 100,000 units of the car has been sold. In that year, the Xpander became the second best-selling passenger car in Indonesia, behind the Toyota Avanza. In 2019, the Xpander was the most exported car in Indonesia, with 64,714 units exported overseas.

References

External links 

  (global)

Xpander
Cars introduced in 2017
2020s cars
Compact MPVs
Front-wheel-drive vehicles
ASEAN NCAP small MPVs
Vehicles with CVT transmission